ISO 13406-2 is an ISO standard, with the full title "Ergonomic requirements for work with visual displays based on flat panels -- Part 2: Ergonomic requirements for flat panel displays". It is best known to end consumers for defining a series of flat-panel display "classes" with different numbers of permitted defects (or "dead pixels"). ISO 13406-2 also provides a classification of Viewing Direction Range Classes and Reflection Classes.

As part of an ISO standard, the classes are guidelines, and not mandatory. Where implemented, the interpretation of the standard by the panel or end product manufacturer and effects in terms of labeling of products, what class of panel is used, etc., can vary. Most flat-panel makers use this standard as the excuse for not accepting returns of defective flat-panels. Many customers argue that it's not honest in the makers' part to sell a product that most people wouldn't accept if they knew it had these defects. Also, there is little offer of Class I panels, that added to the fact that the price of these models is usually very high, make it difficult to buy a totally guaranteed product. One solution to this problem would be to sell these defected panels at a lower price than normal ones, clearly indicating the presence of such defects.

The  ISO 13406-2:2001 standard has been withdrawn and revised by the ISO 9241-302, 303, 305 and 307:2008 standards.

Pixel Fault Classes
The standard lists four classes of devices, where a device of a specified class may contain a certain maximum number of  defective pixels.  Three distinct types of defective pixels are described:
 Type 1 = a hot pixel (always on, being colour white)
 Type 2 = a dead pixel (always off, meaning black)
 Type 3 = a stuck pixel (one or more sub-pixels (red, blue or green) are always on or always off)

The table below shows the maximum number of allowed defects (per type) per 1 million pixels.

, most manufacturers specify their products as Pixel Fault Class II.

References
 The importance of international display standards for both customer and user is explained in this paper presented at the SID Conference 2006: International Display Standards: Status & Agenda", SID'06 International Symposium, Session 9: Display-Measurement&Standards.
 ISO 13406-2:2000 "Ergonomic requirements for work with visual displays based on flat panels -- Part 2: Ergonomic requirements for flat panel displays."
 ISO 9241-300: "Ergonomics of human-system interaction -- Part 300: Introduction to electronic visual display requirements." The ISO 9241-300 series establishes requirements for the ergonomic design of electronic visual displays. These requirements are stated as performance specifications, aimed at ensuring effective and comfortable viewing conditions for users with normal or adjusted-to-normal eyesight. Test methods and metrology, yielding conformance measurements and criteria, are provided for design evaluation. ISO 9241 is applicable to the visual ergonomics design of electronic visual displays for a diversity of tasks in a wide variety of work environments.

13406-2
Display technology